For Sale is the fifth album by German pop band Fool's Garden, released in 2000.

Track listing
All tracks written and composed by Peter Freudenthaler and Volker Hinkel

 "Who Are You?"
 "Allright"
 "Suzy"
 "Missing"
 "Save Me"
 "She's So Happy to Be"
 "It Can Happen"
 "Interlude"
 "In the Name"
 "Still"
 "Pure"
Lead vocals: Volker Hinkel
 "Monday Morning Girl"
 "Noone's Song"
Lead vocals: Peter Freudenthaler and Volker Hinkel
 "Happy"

Musicians
Peter Freudenthaler - vocals
Volker Hinkel - guitars, programming, additional keyboards and backing vocals
Roland Röhl - keyboards
Thomas Mangold - bass
Ralf Wochele - drums
Ulrich Herter - programming and additional keyboards

Singles
Suzy
It Can Happen
Happy (special tour edition)
In The Name

References

2000 albums
Fools Garden albums